Danish Grand Prix is a Formula One motor race.

Danish Grand Prix may also refer to:

Speedway Grand Prix of Denmark
Dansk Melodi Grand Prix, annual music competition